Inquisivi is the capital of the Inquisivi Province in the  La Paz Department, Bolivia. It was officially named on November 2, 1844. Residents of Inquisivi are called Inquisivenos. 

On November 2, 1884, General Narciso Campero officially announced the city as the capital of the new Inquisivi Province.

References 

Populated places in La Paz Department (Bolivia)